A charlatan is a trickster or con artist.

Charlatan may also refer to:

Film and television
The Charlatan (1917 film), a Hungarian film by Michael Curtiz
The Charlatan (1929 film), a Universal Pictures film by George Melford
Charlatan (2020 film), a film by Agnieszka Holland
O Tsarlatanos or The Charlatan, a 1973 Greek film starring Thanasis Veggos

Music
The Charlatan (operetta), an 1898 operetta by John Philip Sousa
The Charlatans (American band), an psychedelic rock band in the 1960s
The Charlatans (1969 album), an album by the American band The Charlatans
The Charlatans (English band), an alternative rock band active since 1989
The Charlatans (1995 album), an album by the English band The Charlatans
Šarlatán, a 1936 opera by Pavel Haas
 Charlatan (album), a 2011 album by Victorian Halls
"Charlatan", a 2008 song by Four Letter Lie from What a Terrible Thing to Say
"Charlatan", a 2011 song by Howling Bells from The Loudest Engine

Books
The Charlatan, an 1895 book by Robert Williams Buchanan and Henry Murray
The Charlatan, a 1934 book by Sydney Horler
The Charlatan, a 2002 book by Derek Walcott
Charlatan: America's Most Dangerous Huckster, the Man Who Pursued Him, and the Age of Flimflam, a 2008 book by Pope Brock about John R. Brinkley

Other uses
The Charlatan (Mei), a 1656 painting by Bernardino Mei
The Charlatan (student newspaper), a student newspaper at Carleton University in Ontario, Canada